The 2019–20 South Alabama Jaguars women's basketball team represented the University of South Alabama during the 2019–20 NCAA Division I women's basketball season. The Jaguars were led by seventh year head coach Terry Fowler and played their home games at the Mitchell Center as members in the Sun Belt Conference. They finished the season 16–16, 9–9 in Sun Belt play to finish in tie for fifth place. They made it to the Sun Belt tournament as the sixth seed (Little Rock broke the tie winning both regular season games against the Jaguars) where they defeated Arkansas State 82–71 in the First Round and also defeated UT Arlington 47–55 in the Quarterfinals. Shortly before playing Coastal Carolina in the semifinals, the Sun Belt canceled the remainder tournament in the wake of the COVID-19 pandemic, which was followed by the NCAA cancelling all post-season play.

Preseason

Sun Belt coaches poll
On October 30, 2019, the Sun Belt released their preseason coaches poll with the Jaguars predicted to finish in fourth place in the conference.

Sun Belt Preseason All-Conference team

1st team

Savannah Jones – R-JR, Guard
Antoinette Lewis – JR, Forward

3rd team

Shaforia Kines – SR, Guard

Preseason Sun Belt Player of the Year
Antoinette Lewis – Junior, Forward

Roster

Schedule

|-
!colspan=9 style=| Exhibition

|-
!colspan=9 style=| Non-conference regular season

|-
!colspan=9 style=| Sun Belt regular season

|-
!colspan=9 style=| Sun Belt Women's Tournament

See also
 2019–20 South Alabama Jaguars men's basketball team

References

External links

South Alabama Jaguars women's basketball seasons
South Alabama